Agabetes acuductus is a species of predaceous diving beetle found in the United States and Canada. Its habitat includes wooded wetlands, in the leaf litter of shaded pools, and cattail ponds.

References

Further reading
 Arnett, R.H. Jr., and M. C. Thomas. (eds.). (2000). American Beetles, Volume I: Archostemata, Myxophaga, Adephaga, Polyphaga: Staphyliniformia. CRC Press LLC, Boca Raton, FL.
 Nilsson, Anders N. (2001). World Catalogue of Insects, volume 3: Dytiscidae (Coleoptera), 395.
 Richard E. White. (1983). Peterson Field Guides: Beetles. Houghton Mifflin Company.
 Ross H. Arnett. (2000). American Insects: A Handbook of the Insects of America North of Mexico. CRC Press.
 Webster, Reginald P. (2008). "New predaceous diving beetle (Coleoptera: Dytiscidae) records for New Brunswick and Canada with new distribution information on some rarely collected species". Journal of the Acadian Entomological Society, vol. 4, 38–45.

Dytiscidae
Beetles described in 1828